Bang Lamung is a district (amphoe) in the southern part of Chonburi province, Thailand.

History 
Mueang Bang Lamung was formerly in Ban Bang Lamung, Tambon Bang Lamung. However, the government downgraded Bang Lamung to a district, with the district office on the banks of Khlong Nok Yang. In 1909, the district head, Phraya Sattaya Nukun (Choem), moved the district office to the seacoast in Tambon Na Kluea.

On 21 October 1952 the district office was completely destroyed by a storm. The office set up temporarily in Bang Lamung School, Sukhumvit Road. The following year the Thai  government approved building a new district office near the school. It is still in use today.

Geography
Neighboring districts are (from the north clockwise) Si Racha of Chonburi Province, Pluak Daeng, Nikhom Phatthana, Ban Chang of Rayong province, Sattahip of Chonburi Province and the Gulf of Thailand. The islands of Ko Lan and Ko Phai are in this district.

Administration
The district is divided into eight sub-districts (tambons), which are further subdivided into 61 villages (mubans). The city of Pattaya is a special municipal area which covers the whole tambon Nong Prue and Na Kluea and parts of Huai Yai and Nong Pla Lai. There are a further two townships (thesaban tambon): Bang Lamung and Laem Chabang. Laem Chabang covers parts of tambon Bang Lamung, and of neighboring Si Racha the complete tambon Bueng, Sura Sak, Thung Su Khla and parts of Nong Kham. Bang Lamung covers parts of the tambon Bang Lamung, Nong Pla Lai, and Takhian Tia. The non-municipal area is administrated by five tambon administrative organizations (TAO).

References

External links
amphoe.com
 Bang Lamung district history (Thai)

Bang Lamung